"Yeah, Yeah, Yeah" is a song performed by Oaktown's 357, released as the second single from their debut album, Wild & Loose. 

The song was written and co-produced by MC Hammer, and released by his Bust It Records label via Capitol Records. 

"Yeah, Yeah, Yeah" peaked at number 9 on the Billboard Hot Rap Songs chart in 1989.

Chart positions

References 

1989 singles
Capitol Records singles
Oaktown's 357 songs
Song recordings produced by MC Hammer
Songs written by MC Hammer
1989 songs